Pilling is a village and civil parish within the Wyre borough of Lancashire, England.

The civil parish of Pilling, which includes the localities of Stake Pool, Scronkey and Eagland Hill, had a total resident population of 1,739 in 2001, increasing to 2,020 at the 2011 Census. Populations in the 19th century ranged from 1,281 in 1851 to 1,572 in 1871.

Etymology
Eilert Ekwall suggests the name is Celtic, linking it with the Welsh place-name element "Pîl" (rendered as Pyl in Old English). This etymology would suggest the settlement started as a tidal inlet used as a harbour. Ekwall suggested the geography of Pilling may be "accurately described as a pill".

The name appears as Pylin in 1246 and, if the name is indeed Celtic in origin, the termination is almost certainly the same as the common Welsh diminutive suffix "-yn", giving the meaning of "small harbour or inlet".

History
Pilling is an ancient settlement, founded on what was essentially an "island" with the sea on one side and marsh on the others. From artefacts finds, there is evidence of spasmodic human activity within this territory dating back to the Neolithic period.

The school had gradually become more and more dilapidated so the contractors knocked it down and used the stones for the railway.

Damside Windmill, on Taylors Lane, was built in 1808.

"Pilling in Bloom" was a competition held in 2004.

Geography

Pilling is an extensive mossland parish covering 3,387 hectares situated on the southern corner of Morecambe Bay. Bus routes link Pilling to Lancaster, Knott End and Fleetwood.

Governance
Since 1974, Pilling has formed part of the Wyre borough of Lancashire served by both Wyre Borough Council and Lancashire County Council, having previously (from 1894) lain within the Garstang Rural District of Lancashire. Pilling has its own Parish Council. The population of Pilling electoral ward in 2011 was 2,293. Pilling is within the constituency of Lancaster and Fleetwood which returned Cat Smith Labour Party (UK) as M.P. in 2019.

Places of interest
Pilling has two pubs: The Elletson Arms in Stakepool and The Golden Ball in the village. There is a community area in the village, equipped with a pathway to Pilling Sands.

There are also several churches, including St John the Baptist Church (Church of England) in the village, St William's Church (Catholic) in Stakepool, and the Pilling Methodist Church in the village.

There are two primary schools: Pilling St John's Church of England Primary School and St William's, both associated with the respective churches.

Notable people
Ralph Slater, millwright

See also

Listed buildings in Pilling

References

External links

Official parish website
Pilling at GENUKI
Pilling St. John's Church of England Primary School
St. William's Catholic Primary School
Golden Ball Hotel

Villages in Lancashire
Civil parishes in Lancashire
Geography of the Borough of Wyre
The Fylde
Populated coastal places in Lancashire
Morecambe Bay